In physics, the intensity or flux of radiant energy is the power transferred per unit area, where the area is measured on the plane perpendicular to the direction of propagation of the energy. In the SI system, it has units watts per square metre (W/m2), or kg⋅s−3 in base units. Intensity is used most frequently with waves such as acoustic waves (sound) or electromagnetic waves such as light or radio waves, in which case the average power transfer over one period of the wave is used. Intensity can be applied to other circumstances where energy is transferred. For example, one could calculate the intensity of the kinetic energy carried by drops of water from a garden sprinkler.

The word "intensity" as used here is not synonymous with "strength", "amplitude", "magnitude", or "level", as it sometimes is in colloquial speech.

Intensity can be found by taking the energy density (energy per unit volume) at a point in space and multiplying it by the velocity at which the energy is moving. The resulting vector has the units of power divided by area (i.e., surface power density).

Mathematical description
If a point source is radiating energy in all directions (producing a spherical wave), and no energy is absorbed or scattered by the medium, then the intensity decreases in proportion to the distance from the object squared. This is an example of the inverse-square law.

Applying the law of conservation of energy, if the net power emanating is constant,

where P is the net power radiated, I is the intensity vector as a function of position, the magnitude  is the intensity as a function of position, and dA is a differential element of a closed surface that contains the source.

If one integrates a uniform intensity, over a surface that is perpendicular to the intensity vector, for instance over a sphere centered around the point source, the equation becomes

Solving for  gives

If the medium is damped, then the intensity drops off more quickly than the above equation suggests.

Anything that can transmit energy can have an intensity associated with it. For a monochromatic propagating electromagnetic wave, such as a plane wave or a Gaussian beam, if E is the complex amplitude of the electric field, then the time-averaged energy density of the wave, travelling in a non-magnetic material, is given by:

and the local intensity is obtained by multiplying this expression by the wave velocity, c/n:

For non-monochromatic waves, the intensity contributions of different spectral components can simply be added. The treatment above does not hold for arbitrary electromagnetic fields. For example, an evanescent wave may have a finite electrical amplitude while not transferring any power. The intensity should then be defined as the magnitude of the Poynting vector.

Alternative definitions
In photometry and radiometry intensity has a different meaning: it is the luminous or radiant power per unit solid angle. This can cause confusion in optics, where intensity can mean any of radiant intensity, luminous intensity or irradiance, depending on the background of the person using the term. Radiance is also sometimes called intensity, especially by astronomers and astrophysicists, and in heat transfer.

See also
Field strength
Sound intensity
Magnitude (astronomy)

References 

Optics
Radiometry
Physical quantities